Rohuzg (also Romanized as Rohūzg, Rohrozg, Rehīzeg, Rehīzek, Rohūq, and Ruhūzg) is a village in Naharjan Rural District, Mud District, Sarbisheh County, South Khorasan Province, Iran. At the 2006 census, its population was 41, with 10 families.

References 

Populated places in Sarbisheh County